Tia Blassingame (born 1971, New Haven, CT), assistant professor of art at  Scripps College, is an American book artist and  publisher.

Biography
Blassingame holds a B.A. in Architecture from Princeton University, a M.A. in Book Arts and printmaking from the Corcoran College of Art & Design, and an M.F.A. in Printmaking from the Rhode Island School of Design. She was Artist-in-Residence at the International Print Center (2019), Yaddo (2011), MacDowell (2010) and the Santa Fe Art Institute (2010).

Blassingame is Assistant Professor of Art and Director of Scripps College Press at Scripps College, Claremont, CA. Her work has been collected by private and public collections, including the Library of Congress, the Massachusetts Institute of Technology, Harvard University, The Tate in Britain, the National Museum of Women in the Arts and Yale University. Her work has appeared in the Brooklyn Rail.

In 2019, Blassingame was a contributing writer in Freedom of the Presses: Artist Books in the Twenty-first Century. She also founded the Book/Print Artist/Scholar of Color collective in the same year. She has been owner and proprietor at Primrose Press, since 2009. She serves on the Board of Directors for the College Book Art Association and is a member of the Board of Trustees for the American Printing History Association.

Art and exhibitions

Artistic style 
Blassingame's work in mixed-media, bookmaking, printmaking, and flag-making employs elements of Concrete poetry and uses books and physical artifacts to provide the viewer with a tactile interaction with the conversation around racism in the United States. Blassingame has also been active in scholarly understanding and symposia exploring the history and production of Black books and bibliographia.

Selected exhibitions 
Blassingame has exhibited throughout the U.S., including:
 2014 "The Exact Measure of Cruelty: Slavery and Racism in Artists’ Books", Milner Library, Illinois State University
 2018 Mourning/Warning, Atkinson Gallery, Santa Barbara City College. In this exhibition, Blassingame provides a look into her experience as an African-American woman.
 2018 Text & Textile, Art and Architecture Library at Yale University
 2019 Playing with Words at the Minnesota Center for Book Arts (MCBA)
 2019 I Am Mourning/Warning, Morey Family Gallery at Art Reach of Mid-Michigan 
 2019 Umbra: New Prints for a Dark Age at International Print Center
 2020 I AM/YOU ARE, Berea College. In her art book, Blassingame comments on her experience as an African-American woman through the medium of printmaking. She also offers insight into experiences of police brutality, violence and humiliation through the lens of being African-American. 
 2020 Intersections: Book Arts as Conversion at Tulane University

Further reading 
 Freedom of the Presses: artists' books in the twenty-first century. Marshall Weber, ed. Brooklyn, NY: Booklyn, [2018]. ISBN 978069216678

References

External links 
 
 "Tia Blassingame: Despite Hostile Terrain." Rare Book School lecture, 10 June 2019.

1971 births
Living people
21st-century American women artists
African-American artists
African-American women artists
American art educators
Scripps College faculty
Rhode Island School of Design alumni
Princeton University School of Architecture alumni
Corcoran School of the Arts and Design alumni
Book artists